Pomigliano Calcio Femminile, also known as Pomigliano, is an Italian women's association football club based in Pomigliano d'Arco, Metropolitan City of Naples. It was founded in June 2019 and secured two successive promotions in its first two seasons, to enter Serie A in 2021.

History
In June 2019, Raffaele Pipola the President of ASDC Pomigliano, a club in the men's Serie D, formed a women's section for the club by buying out an existing team called Vapa Virtus Napoli. Due to the COVID-19 pandemic in Italy, their debut 2019–20 season was stopped early and since Pomigliano were leading their regional Serie C section they were promoted to Serie B. In 2020–21 they finished in second place behind Lazio to claim their second successive promotion, into the top tier Serie A.

Former Italy women's national football team player Manuela Tesse was the coach who secured the second promotion, but she was fired three games into the 2021–22 Serie A season.

Players

Current squad

Former players

References

External links 
 Official website

Pomigliano
Football clubs in Campania
Association football clubs established in 2019
2019 establishments in Italy